Jorge Gutiérrez (born September 6, 1979) is a professional male squash player who represented Argentina during his career. He reached a career-high world ranking of World No. 152 in March 2005.

External links
 

1979 births
Living people
Argentine male squash players
Pan American Games silver medalists for Argentina
Pan American Games bronze medalists for Argentina
Pan American Games medalists in squash
Squash players at the 1999 Pan American Games
Squash players at the 2003 Pan American Games
Medalists at the 1999 Pan American Games
Medalists at the 2003 Pan American Games